The Kamatchi Amman Temple is an ancient Hindu Temple dedicated to the goddess Kamakshi, one of the highest aspects of Adi Shakti in Shaktism. It is located in the historic city of Kanchipuram, near Chennai, India. Its construction is credited to the Pallava kings, whose capital was in the same city. This temple, along with the Meenakshi Temple in Madurai and the Akilandeswari temple in Thiruvanaikaval near Tiruchirappalli are the important centers of Goddess worship in the state of Tamil Nadu.The present temple with goddess seated in padmasana was once known as Kaamakotta Nayaki shrine, where Lalitha Tripura Sundari has settled in this temple after the destruction of the demon called Bhandasura. This ancient temple got mentioned in Perunaraatrupadai, an ancient Tamil sangam literature which praises the renowned sangam era king Thondaiman Ilanthiraiyan who ruled whole Thondai mandalam during sangam era with Kanchipuram as capital city. The original golden statue was seen with two hands adorning a parrot in her right hand is called as Bhangaru Kamakshi was replaced with the current panchaloha idol to avoid ruins of invasion. Now the golden goddess is residing in the West masi veedhi of Tanjavore with aseparate shrine, as escorted by Shyama Shastri.

The image of the main deity, Kamakshi, is seated in a Padmasana, a yogic posture signifying peace and prosperity, instead of the traditional standing pose. The goddess holds a sugarcane bow and bunch of five flowers in the lower two of her arms and has a pasha (lasso), an ankusha (goad) in her upper two arms. A parrot perches near the flower bunch. There are no other goddess temples in the city of Kanchipuram, apart from this one, which is unusual in a city that has hundreds of traditional temples. There are various legends that account for this fact.

According to a local legend, Adi Shankaracharya established the Sri Chakra in this Kamakshi Devi temple in the trough-like structure in that shrine.

Origin
In the Sangam text Perumpanatruppadai, the temple has been mentioned as Kamavelkottam along with Kumarakottam, which was then ruled by the Sangam-era King Thondaiman Ilandiraiyan. In some Hindu scriptures, Kamakshi Amman is considered in line with Meenakshi at Madurai, and Visalakshi at Varanasi. Kamakshi is the only Shakti shrine centered across all Shiva temples in Kanchipuram which do not have separate shrines for Amman. Kamakshi is praised as 'Shri Matha' (respected mother) as the first name in Lalitha Sahasranama. Tantric texts such as Tripura Rahasya, Bahvrucha Upanishad, as well as Puranas such Brahmanda Purana and Markandeya Purana discuss how Lalitha Devi resides in Kamakoti Peetha in Kanchi.

Architecture
The sanctum houses the image of Kamakshi in seated posture and is flanked by the trinity of Shiva, Vishnu and Brahma. There are smaller shrines of Bangaru Kamakshi, Adi Shankara. and Maha Saraswathi around the sanctum. The picture provides a glimpse view of Temple Pond and Gaja Shed. Everyday the temple rituals start with the Gau (sacred cow) Pooja and Gaja (elephant) Pooja. There is a separate shed with elephants, which performs pooja to the deity by trumpeting every day early morning 5.AM. In front of the Grabagraha there is a Gayatri Mandapam to the right of the shire we can see the deities arupa lakshmi, swaropa lakshmi. The temple is maintained and administered by the Hindu Religious and Charitable Endowments Department of the Government of Tamil Nadu. The Devi in Adi Kamakshi temple which is close by the present Kamakshi temple, is called by various names like Kirtimati, Devagarbha in extant Tantric works like Tantrachudamani. She has four hands containing in each of them respectively, Ankusa, Pasa, Abhaya and a Kapala. This description corresponds to those extant old tantric works.

Festivals
Four worship services are offered each day. The annual festival falls in Spring, in the Tamil month of Masi, which runs from mid-February to mid-March. During this Mahotsavam, the most important day to be celebrated is Maasi Pooram, which is the Avirbhava dhina of Lalitha Maha Tripura Sundari in Kanchi. Other than that, the chariot festival (Ther) and float festival, (Theppam) are held. Other festivals include Navaratri, Aadi and Aippasi Pooram, Sankara Jayanthi and Vasanta Utsavam in the Tamil month of Vaikasi. All Fridays are considered sacred, though the Fridays in the Tamil months of Adi (mid-July to mid-August) and Thai (mid-January to mid-February) are celebrated.

Shrines 

Shri Lalita Parabhattarika presides over the Kamakoshtha in five forms:

 Shri Kamakshi Para Bhattarika – Sri Kamakshi is the mula devata of the Kamakoti Peetha seated in the centre of the inner sanctorum of the shrine in Kanchipuram known as the Gayatri mantapam. According to kamakshi rahasya, this mandapa was built by the celestials with the four walls representing the four Vedas and the twenty-four pillars representing the twenty-four syllables of the sacred formula of Gayatri. Shrividya Parameshvari, who forms the inner core of the prakata gayatri and thus called Rahasya Gayatri, is enshrined at the centre of the Gayatri mandapam as Shri Kamakshi. She is seated on pancha brahmasana and sports in her four hands Pasha, Ankusha, Iskhu Kodanda and Pushpa Bana. Paramba is seated in yonyasana and faces southeast. When tormented by asuras led by Bhandasura, devas are said to have performed a penance to appease the Supreme Shakti in the form of parrots, residing on champaka vrkshas at Kanchi. Pleased with their penance, Paramba is said to have appeared from her residence in Mahameru or Bilakasha through the bila dvara and destroyed the demons. The shri vigraha of Paramba has been described as representing her three forms: sthula (Dhyana yogya, Savayava), Sukshma (mantra and yantratmaka) and Karana or Vasanatmaka. It is also said that Lord Mahadeva himself worshipped paramba in the four yugas assuming the forms of sages krodha bhattaraka, parashurama, dhaumya and Adi Shankara Bhagavatpada (and muka shankara, believed to be an incarnation of krodha bhattaraka). The bila dvara leading to bilakasha can be seen today in front of the tapomagna kamakshi sannidhi inside the garbhagrha. It is also said that Bhagavan Rudra assumed the form of Durvasas on her emergence from the bilakasha and first worshipped her through the modalities of Shrividya tantra by consecrating a Shrichakra here. He is thus the sampradaya guru of shrividya and the credit for crystallizing paramba at Kanchipuram as Gurumurtisvarupini (Charyanandanatha-para bhattarika mithunatmika) goes to this great seer. The forms of vashinyadi Vagdevatas can be seen around the Shrichakra in their same positions as in Shripura. A shrine dedicated to hayagrIva and agastya can be seen in the third prakara of the temple, at the location where the teaching of Lalita Trishati was imparted.
 Tapah Kamakshi – This form of paramba can be seen to the right of the mula devata and close to the bila dvara. Separated from mahadeva, uma appeared first as annapurna in Kashi and then following the advice of sage Katyayana, appeared in Kanchi to worship Ekamranatha under the mango tree in rudrakoshtha and married him.
 Anjana Kamakshi – Also known as Arupa , her shrine is situated to the left of the mula devata, facing the north and in front of saubhagya ganapati. Rama is said to have performed a penance to regain her lost beauty in this place and due to the grace of paramba, kumkuma offerings of mula devata is offered to her here before being accepted by the devotees. While she represents Rama in her form as rama-bija, she represents Kamakshi in the form of Kamakalakshara that is inherent in the Rama bIja.
 Svarna Kamakshi – The shrine of this deity, also known as Bangaru Kamakshi is situated in the second prakara. It is said that this form was created by Shrividya parameshvari from her third eye to serve as the shakti of ekamranatha named ekambika. The original idol that appeared from the third-eye of paramba is seen today in Tanjore, which was transported to Tanjore to protect the idol from Muslim attacks by Kamakshidasa, an ancestor of the Carnatic music genius Shri Shyama Shastrigal.
 Utsava Kamakshi – The shrine of Utsava Kamakshi, the idol which is brought out during processions, is located in the second prakara. The idol is accompanied on either side by idols of Sharada and Rama. While the devatas generally are accompanied by their male/female consorts in most cases, on account of Kamakshi being Shiva-shaktyatmika, there is no shrine devoted to Shiva here. Sri Lalitambika, who appeared from Chidagni for the destruction of Bhandasura, was presented to the world by Brahma with the special name – Sri Kamakshi. Thus, ‘Kamakshi’ is the special epithet of the primordial Parashakti Sri Lalita. As she brings joy to the mind of Sri Kameshwara, she is referred to as ‘Sri Lalita’.

Significance 

The shrine situated in front of Sri Kamakshi’s Garbha Grham is of Sage Durvasa, also known as Krodha Bhattaraka. There are thirty-two chief upasakas of Devi like manu, chandra, kubera etc. Among these, Kamaraja, Lopamudra and Durvasa are the chief upasakas. Durvasa pranita vidya is called Sadi vidya. Durvasa represents the power of sattvika krodha of Amba, used to protect and correct her devotees, and thus her limitless kriya shakti. It is Sri Durvasa who is held to have established the Kamakoti Peetha by consecrating a Bhu-Prastara Srichakra in front of Amba. He composed Lalita Stavaratna, also called Arya dwisahti, describing the Srinagara. He also composed Traipura Mahimna Stotra, a complete mantra shastra in itself and also the Para Shambhu Mahimna Stotra. Due to a curse by Saraswati, he was born as a deaf and dumb brahmana and was graced by Sri Kamakshi with Anugraha Diksha.

Shakti Peetha 

The ancient story of Daksha yaga and Sati's self-immolation is the main theme in the origin of Shakti Peethas.

Shakti Peethas are divine temples of Adiparashakti. The cause of the presence of Devi's presence is due to the falling of body parts of the corpse of Sati Devi. The naval part of Sati Devi's body is believed to have fallen here. There are 51 Shakti Peeth linking to the 51 alphabets in Sanskrit. There are also arguments that the old Kanchi temple is the Shakti peetha, where Sankaracharya has installed the Shri Chakra.

Tirukkalvanur 
In the shrine of Kamakshi Amman close to the sanctum, the Tirukalavanur Divya Desam, the temples dedicated to Vishnu in his form of Varaha glorified by the 7th-10th century Alvars (Tamil saint poets) is present. The temple faced west went to ruins and the deity is now placed inside the Kamakshi Amman temple. There are shrines over the vimana.

References

External links

 Temple Information Website
 Templenet entry for temple
 Photos of Kamakshi temple of Kanchipuram, 1280x960

Hindu temples in Kanchipuram
Parvati temples
Divya Desams
Shakti Peethas